Hot Country Songs and Country Airplay are charts that rank the top-performing country music songs in the United States, published by Billboard magazine.  Hot Country Songs ranks songs based on digital downloads, streaming, and airplay not only from country stations but from stations of all formats, a methodology introduced in 2012.  Country Airplay, which was published for the first time in 2012, is based solely on country radio airplay, a methodology which had previously been used for several decades for Hot Country Songs.  In 2017, seven different songs topped the Hot Country Songs chart and 34 different songs topped Country Airplay in 52 issues of the magazine.

In the issue of Billboard dated February 25, singer Sam Hunt reached number one with the song "Body Like a Back Road", which would remain in the top spot  through the issue dated October 14.  In August, the song broke the record for the most weeks spent at number one on the Hot Country Songs listing, surpassing the 24 weeks spent in the top spot by Florida Georgia Line's "Cruise" in 2012 and 2013. Hunt's song was finally knocked from the top of the chart in the issue dated October 21 by "What Ifs" by Kane Brown featuring Lauren Alaina. Two months later, "Meant to Be" by Bebe Rexha and Florida Georgia Line entered the Hot Country chart at number one, only the fourth time a song had debuted in the top position of the Hot Country Songs chart. The song would go on to break Hunt's record the following summer when it spent a 35th consecutive week at number one. On the Country Airplay chart, Dustin Lynch had the longest run at number one of 2017, spending four consecutive weeks at the top with "Small Town Boy". Lynch tied with Blake Shelton for the highest total number of weeks at number one on that chart, both artists spending five weeks in the top spot.  Shelton took three different songs to number one, a feat also achieved by Thomas Rhett. No act achieved more than one chart-topper on the Hot Country Songs listing.

Ten acts gained their first country number ones in 2017. Lauren Alaina topped the airplay chart for the first time in April with "Road Less Traveled" and was subsequently featured on "What Ifs", which was the first chart-topper for Kane Brown, reaching the top spot of both charts.  Luke Combs topped the airplay chart in May with "Hurricane", his debut single, and was immediately followed into the top spot by another debut chart-topper, Brett Young's "In Case You Didn't Know".  In July, Backstreet Boys, an internationally successful pop act since the 1990s, gained their first country number one when they collaborated with Florida Georgia Line on the song "God, Your Mama, and Me". Two weeks later, Maren Morris made her debut at number one thanks to her featured performance on Thomas Rhett's song "Craving You", which was replaced in the top spot by "My Girl", the first number one for Dylan Scott. In November, Carly Pearce took her debut single "Every Little Thing" to number one, and the following week, the band Lanco gained its first chart-topper with "Greatest Love Story". The final artist to reach number one for the first time in 2017 was Bebe Rexha. More closely associated with the pop music and R&B genres, Rexha's collaboration with Florida Georgia Line was her first country hit.

Chart history

See also
2017 in country music
List of artists who reached number one on the U.S. country chart
List of Top Country Albums number ones of 2017
List of number-one country singles of 2017 (Canada)

References

2017
Number-one country singles
United States Country Singles